Pat Shortridge is a Minnesota lobbyist, former Chair of the Republican Party of Minnesota and founder of Conservative Solutions Project.

Early life and education
Shortridge was born in Winona, Minnesota. He attended Macalester College.

Political career
After graduating from Macalester College, Shortridge became an intern, then paid staffer, of Texas Representative Dick Armey, eventually working for him for eleven years. He left Armey's employment in 2001 to become a lobbyist for Enron, a position he held for approximately six months before the company went into bankruptcy as a result of the Enron scandal.

After the brief position at Enron, Shortridge returned to Minnesota to work for Representative Mark Kennedy for five years.  He ran Kennedy's campaign in the 2006 senate election, which Kennedy lost by over 20 percentage points to DFL candidate Amy Klobuchar.

In 2011, Minnesota Republican chairman Tony Sutton abruptly departed among controversy. Shortridge was elected by 350 party delegates at a meeting on December 31 in St. Cloud, Minnesota over two other candidates.  The Republican Party of Minnesota faced a debt of over $2 million at the time of Shortridge's election, which he managed to reduce significantly during his first year as chairman. He has insisted that he would only serve out the remainder of Sutton's term which expires on April 6, 2013, when party delegates will select a new chair. He was succeeded by Keith Downey.

Personal life
Shortridge resides in Lino Lakes, Minnesota.

References

Minnesota Republicans
Living people
People from Winona, Minnesota
Macalester College alumni
People from Lino Lakes, Minnesota
Year of birth missing (living people)
State political party chairs of Minnesota